Gordon is an unincorporated, census-designated place; located in the town of Gordon, Douglas County, Wisconsin, United States.

History
A post office called Gordon was established in 1882.  The community was named for Antoine Gordon, a French trader with the Indians.

Transportation
U.S. Highway 53 serves as a main route in the community.

Population
As of the 2010 census, its population was 176.

Gordon has a post office with ZIP code 54838.

References

Census-designated places in Douglas County, Wisconsin
Census-designated places in Wisconsin